Ratatat is the debut album from the Brooklyn-based electronic duo of the same name. It was recorded between July 2001 and May 2003 in bassist Evan Mast's Crown Heights, Brooklyn apartment and mixed in June 2003 before its release on April 20, 2004.

The album is essentially instrumental, although it has occasional voice excerpts (referred to in the liner notes as "spoken interludes") by local MC and rapper Young Churf. The track "Spanish Armada" contains a French horn played by Michal Emanovsky. Other tracks of note are "Germany to Germany", later released as a single; and "Cherry", a homage to Ratatat's original name.

The most well known song on the album is "Seventeen Years". It was featured in a television advertisement titled "Accessorize" for the Hummer H2 in 2004, in the British television show Soccer AM as the original background music for The Crossbar Challenge segment, and in Level One Productions's ski movie Shanghai Six. 
It was also played during Rob's party in the 2008 monster movie Cloverfield as well as Keith Hufnagel's part in the DVS skateboard video Skate More. The song "Bustelo" was used in several Jaguar commercials in mid-2006.

Track listing
"Seventeen Years" – 4:26
"El Pico" – 4:41
"Crips" – 3:47
"Desert Eagle" – 4:25
"Everest" – 4:10
"Bustelo" – 2:27
"Breaking Away" – 4:19
"Lapland" – 4:56
"Germany to Germany" – 3:38
"Spanish Armada" – 2:58
"Cherry" – 5:58

References

External links
Official Ratatat Website
Official Cherry video

2004 debut albums
Ratatat albums
XL Recordings albums
Albums produced by E*vax